Cosmas Banda (born 29 December 1975) is a Zambian footballer who played as a striker. He played in 12 matches for the Zambia national football team from 1996 to 2002. He was also named in Zambia's squad for the 2002 African Cup of Nations tournament.

References

1975 births
Living people
Zambian footballers
Zambia international footballers
2002 African Cup of Nations players
Place of birth missing (living people)
Association football forwards
Lusaka Dynamos F.C. players
Zanaco F.C. players
Sarawak FA players
Perlis FA players
City of Lusaka F.C. players